Springfield High School (SHS) is a public comprehensive high school in Springfield, Ohio. It is administratively divided into five academies, but all classes are available to all students. The school was first established in 1911. In 1960 the High School divided into two separate high schools, Springfield North and Springfield South. SHS was re-established in 2008 as one High School.

History 

The school was founded in 1911, then split into two high schools (North and South) in the fall of 1960. South High kept the original Springfield High School building, located at 700 South Limestone Street near the city's downtown, which was modeled after the Library of Congress and renowned for its large white dome. South also kept Springfield High's nickname, "Wildcats," and school colors of navy and gold. North High, was nicknamed "Panthers" and used red, blue, and white as its school colors.  The two high schools shared Evans Stadium, which was used by Springfield High, until North High built its own stadium on the campus of its school.  In 2008, North and South merged back into "Springfield High School."  A new high school building and campus was built at the location of the old North High. The new Springfield High took the "Wildcats" nickname, adopted blue, gold and white as its colors and continues to use Evans Stadium for football. It also uses the on-campus stadium North High built for other sporting events. The school district uses the old Springfield High/South High building for administrative purposes, but is no longer allowed to be used for teaching or classroom purposes per state guidelines.

In the second year of Springfield High School's opening, a decision was made to change the names of the four small schools. Starting the 2010–2011 school year, instead of having the four small schools Problem Based Learning, Humanities, Leadership and Global Perspectives, the fall of 2010 marked those four small school's transformation into five separate academies. These academies are meant to allow each student to join with students and staff with similar interests and needs. The five academies are called Preparatory Academy, Exploratory Academy, STEM Academy, International Arts & Communications Academy, and Health & Human Services Academy.

Athletics

Football 
Springfield competes in the Greater Western Ohio Conference in the Ohio High School Athletic Association. The Wildcats have been coached by NFL veteran Maurice Douglas since 2014. In eight seasons, he has compiled a .598 winning percentage with appearances in the state semifinals in 2019 and 2020, and the state finals in 2021.

State championships 

 Boys' cross country – 1938, 1940
 Boys' track and field – 1957, 1958
 Boys' basketball – 1925, 1950

Notable alumni
Ron Burton, professional football player in the American Football League; member of the College Football Hall of Fame
Trey DePriest, professional football player in the National Football League (NFL)
Alice Hohlmayer, professional baseball player in the All-American Girls Professional Baseball League
Edythe Kirchmaier, centenarian known for being the oldest user on Facebook
Johnny Lytle, boxer, jazz musician
Jim Rhodes, Governor of Ohio
Jonathan Winters, comedian and actor

References

External links 
 School Website

High schools in Clark County, Ohio
Buildings and structures in Springfield, Ohio
Educational institutions established in 1911
1911 establishments in Ohio
Public high schools in Ohio